Andrea Vallocchia (born 22 May 1997) is an Italian footballer who plays as a midfielder for Serie C club Reggiana.

Club career
He made his professional Serie C debut for Sambenedettese on 29 October 2016 in a game against Feralpisalò.

On 21 August 2021, he signed a two-year contract with an option to extend for another year with Serie B club Cosenza. He made his Serie B debut for Cosenza on 22 August 2021 against Ascoli.

On 2 January 2023 he joined Reggiana on permanent basis.

References

External links
 
 

1996 births
People from Rieti
Footballers from Lazio
Living people
Italian footballers
Association football midfielders
Benevento Calcio players
A.S. Sambenedettese players
Olbia Calcio 1905 players
S.S. Juve Stabia players
Cosenza Calcio players
A.C. Reggiana 1919 players
Serie D players
Serie C players
Serie B players
Sportspeople from the Province of Rieti